is a Buddhist temple of the Shingon sect located in Kamakura, Kanagawa Prefecture, Japan. It was founded in 1259 by Ninshō (1217-1303) and has been restored and rebuilt many times since then.

See also

 For an explanation of terms concerning Japanese Buddhism, Japanese Buddhist art, and Japanese Buddhist temple architecture, see the Glossary of Japanese Buddhism.

References and external links
Frederic, Louis (2002). "Japan Encyclopedia." Cambridge, Massachusetts: Harvard University Press.

1259 establishments in Asia
Buddhist temples in Kamakura, Kanagawa
1250s establishments in Japan
Shingon Ritsu temples